Ronaldo Augusto Antonio Oliveira (born 2 November 1997) is an Indian professional footballer who plays as a winger for I-League club RoundGlass Punjab.

Youth Career 
Ronaldo started his career in the youth academy of Salgaocar and participated in the 2015-16 U-18 I-League and reached the Semi-Finals. He scored 9 goals for Salgaocar U18 in the tournament.

Career

Salgaocar 
In 2017-18, he was promoted to the Salgaocar senior side and participated in the Goa Professional League. In the 2018–19 Goa Professional League, Ronaldo scored 23 goals as he became the top scorer and helped Salgaocar finish 4th in the 2018-19 Goa Professional League. Ronaldo scored a few hatricks in the tournament which included 4 goals in one game against FC Bardez on 21 February 2019. In August 2018, he caught the eye of scouts as he scored against Indian Super League side FC Pune City in the Awes Cup and helped Salgaocar win by 2-0. 

In 2019, Ronaldo represented Goa in the 2018–19 Santosh Trophy and reached the Semi-Finals where they lost by 2-1 to Punjab. Ronaldo scored the only goal for Goa in the Semi-Final.

East Bengal
In 2019, Ronaldo signed for I-League side and Kolkata giants: East Bengal FC on a 3 years contract, after a successful week of trials under the observation of coach Alejandro Menendez.

George Telegraph SC 
He made his debut against George Telegraph S.C. on 9 August in the 2019-20 Calcutta Premier Division which East Bengal lost 0-1. He also started in the Kolkata Derby in the 2019-20 Calcutta Premier Division. He came on as a substitute against Kalighat MS in the second half and provided a brilliant assist with the outside of his foot for Jaime Santos Colado to score and ensure the win for East Bengal FC. He is a part of the squad to play the 2019-20 I-League. He was released in January 2020.

FC Bengaluru United 
FC Bengaluru United have signed Ronaldo Oliveira on a free transfer

Career statistics

Club

Honours

Salgaocar
Goa Professional League Golden Boot: 2018-19

 Kerala Blasters ‘B’ 
Kerala Premier League: 2019-20

References

External links

1997 births
Living people
Indian footballers
I-League players
East Bengal Club players
Association football forwards
Footballers from Goa
Kerala Blasters FC Reserves and Academy players
Salgaocar FC players
FC Bengaluru United players
I-League 2nd Division players
Goa Professional League players